George Leonard Weed (February 7, 1857 – December 2, 1916) was an American politician from New York.

Life 
George was born on February 7, 1857, in Brooklyn. His parents were William H. Weed and Maria Louise Fisher.

He went to Brooklyn Collegiate and Polytechnic Institute (today the New York University Tandon School of Engineering). Afterwards, he studied law under Horatio C. King and worked at Weed and Becker Manufacturing Company, which made tools and axes. He was a member of a number of fraternal orders, including the Freemasons (where he was a 32nd degree Scottish Rite), the Knights Templar, the Knights of the Mystic Shrine, the Royal Arcanum, the American Legion of Honor, the National Provident Union, and the Order of the Golden Chain.

George, active in local Republican politics, was elected to the New York State Assembly in 1889, representing the Kings County 11th District. He served in the Assembly in 1890 and, after a year away from the Assembly, in 1892.

George was ill for the last 12 years of his life, and he died on December 2, 1916, in Brooklyn. He was buried in Cypress Hills Cemetery.

References

External links 

 The New York Red Book. United States, Williams Press, 1892. p. 169.
 Political Graveyard

1857 births
1916 deaths
Republican Party members of the New York State Assembly
Burials at Cypress Hills Cemetery
Politicians from Brooklyn
19th-century American politicians
Polytechnic Institute of New York University alumni
American Freemasons